This is a list of warship classes built for the Romanian Navy that served during the Second World War.

Romania
World_War_II_warship_classes
World_War_II_warship_classes